Pálmar Sigurðsson (born 7 February 1963) is an Icelandic former basketball player and coach, and a former member of the Icelandic national team. In 2001 he was named to the Icelandic basketball team of the 20th century by the Icelandic Basketball Association.

Club career
Pálmar started his career with Haukar and helped them win the 2. deild karla in 1981. In 1983, he led Haukar to victory in the 1. deild karla and promotion to the top-tier Úrvalsdeild karla. In 1988 he led Haukar to the national championship after making 11 three-point shots in the fifth and deciding game of the finals against Njarðvík. The same year he was named the Icelandic All-Star Game MVP. He retired early in November 1995.

National team career
Pálmar played 74 games for the Icelandic national team from 1982 to 1992.

Personal life
Pálmar's son is  handballer Aron Pálmarsson.

References

External links
Úrvalsdeild statistics at Icelandic Basketball Association

1963 births
Living people
Palmar Sigurdsson
Palmar Sigurdsson
Palmar Sigurdsson
Palmar Sigurdsson
Shooting guards
Palmar Sigurdsson